Founded in 2002, C-nario is a provider of digital signage software, headquartered in Israel.

The company, which was recently acquired by YCD Multimedia, has customers in a variety of industries: Retail, Banking, Transportation, Advertising and Media, Entertainment, Sporting events and Facilities, Education, and Telecom, among others. 
The company has offices in the United States, Europe, and Israel.

C-nario is a privately held company, backed by leading VCs: Carmel Ventures (Israel) and Opus Capital (USA).

History 
C-nario was established in 2002 in Israel, as a spin-off of Disk-In. In 2003 the company started its international activity and signed an agreement with Philips. In 2004 the company opened its US office.

In 2005, C-nario installed a digital signage network in 250 branches of Israel's Bank Hapoalim, and in 2007 the company's platform was selected by JCDecaux as the digital signage software in a digital signage network at JFK and LAX airports in the US. This network was later expanded to more than a dozen US airports. In addition, C-nario's software was implemented at McDonald's in Singapore and London's O2 Arena.

In 2008, C-nario opened its office in Paris. Later that year C-nario won the Digi Award for Excellence in Entertainment Technology, and the company announced  a new worldwide value-added partner program for selling and marketing its digital signage software-based platforms. Some of the prominent projects in which C-nario software was implemented included Shanghai Airport, Casino da Madeira in Portugal, New York Stock Exchange (NYSE), Harrah's Resort in Atlantic City, USA, Comcast and Club Med. The company also announced partnerships with PlayNetwork and Mitsubishi Electric. C-nario won the Digi award for the O2 Arena project.

In 2009, C-nario expanded its partners network and signed agreements with T-Systems – Deutsche Telekom's corporate customer division, TruMedia Technologies –a provider of real-time audience measurement and proactive advertising solutions, Vizrt – a developer of real-time 3D graphics solutions and video assets management for the broadcast industry, SDI Gesellschaft für Medientechnologie – a German provider of audio visual professional services, Hantarex Electronic Systems – a provider of displays, and IKUSI  – a global provider of communications and electronic solutions and services. Clients that implemented C-nario software included Orange Israel and the Olympic Experience Museum of the Olympic Committee of Israel, among others.

In 2010, C-nario announced its support for the Intel Core i7 Processor and the Microsoft Windows Embedded Standard 2011 platform, as well as its support for Intel Active Management Technology (Intel AMT). The company deployed its software platform in more airports: Milan's Malpensa and Linate Airports (Italy) and Mumbai International Airport (India). Other prominent clients this year included Turk Telekom – Turkey's largest telecommunications provider, and the Israeli Pavilion at Expo 2010 China, the museum of Brazil's Sport Club Internacional (Inter), one of the country's leading soccer teams, and the restaurants of Six Flags, the world's largest regional theme park company. C-nario signed a partnership agreement with AOpen. The Olympic Experience Museum of the Olympic Committee of Israel, a C-nario-based project, earned an Apex Award in the Art, Entertainment and Recreation category. C-nario and its partners won the Digi awards for the projects at Inter and Expo 2010 Israeli pavilion. These two projects won also the Apex Award in 2011.

Prominent customers that implemented C-nario software in 2011 are the National Bank of Greece (NBG), EMT Madrid – Madrid's public bus company, the prestigious Swiss watchmaker Hublot, Moscow's One Window project –  a municipal initiative to improve citizen services, Israel Discount Bank - Israel's third largest bank, the University of Deusto – one of Spain's most prestigious universities, and four Turkish airports. C-nario has also signed partnership agreement with ConeXus World.

Products 
C-nario was the first company to provide digital signage applications for video walls and other arrangements of multiple displays (collages, seamless projection, etc.).

C-nario's software treats any number of screens as ONE canvas and is inherently designed to drive and support synchronized content over video walls in any shape, size and resolution, including real time-content composition.

C-nario Messenger – a complete digital signage display, distribution and management software platform for digital signage networks, providing playback in any shape, size and resolution. C-nario Messenger comprises playback engine, and management, monitoring and control tools. The system is based on open architecture, enabling integration with customer's operational systems such as ERP, CRM, billing etc., as well as external dynamic feeds including GPS, SMS, live broadcast interactive sources, etc.

C-sign – digital signage designed for small and medium businesses, enabling users to upload all types of content (video, images, text) easily, schedule the content and manage it through a Web browser with a user friendly interface, from anywhere, anytime. C-sign includes pre-designed graphic templates that can be customized to the user's preferences.

References and notes

External links 
C-nario official site
Digital Signage Today
 Digital Signage Insider Guide

Software companies of Israel
Signage